Lachnagrostis is a genus of African, Australian, Pacific Island, and South American plants in the grass family. They are often treated as members of genus Agrostis.

 Species
 Lachnagrostis adamsonii - Victoria
 Lachnagrostis aemula  - Australia incl Lord Howe I
 Lachnagrostis ammobia  -  New Zealand (South)
 Lachnagrostis barbuligera - South Africa, Lesotho, Eswatini
 Lachnagrostis batesii - South Australia
 Lachnagrostis billardierei - Australia, New Zealand (North+ South+ Chatham Is)
 Lachnagrostis × contracta - Victoria (L. adamsonii × L. deflexa)
 Lachnagrostis deflexa - Victoria 
 Lachnagrostis drummondiana - Western Australia
 Lachnagrostis elata - New Zealand (North+ South)
 Lachnagrostis filiformis - Australia (incl Norfolk I), New Guinea, Lesser Sunda Is, New Zealand (North+ South + Antipodes+ Chatham + Kermadec Is), Easter I; naturalized in South Africa, Taiwan, scattered locales in the Americas
 Lachnagrostis glabra - New Zealand (North)
 Lachnagrostis lachnantha - Yemen, eastern + southern Africa from Eritrea to Cape Province
 Lachnagrostis lacunis - Tasmania
 Lachnagrostis leptostachys - New Zealand (Antipodes)
 Lachnagrostis leviseta - Victoria
 Lachnagrostis limitanea - South Australia
 Lachnagrostis littoralis - New Zealand (North+ South+ Chatham + Kermadec Is)
 Lachnagrostis lyallii - New Zealand (North+ South+ Chatham Is)
 Lachnagrostis meionectes- Victoria, New South Wales
 Lachnagrostis morrisii - Tasmania
 Lachnagrostis nesomytica - Western Australia
 Lachnagrostis palustris - South Australia, Victoria
 Lachnagrostis perennis - South Australia
 Lachnagrostis pilosa - New Zealand (North+ South+ Antipodes + Chatham Is)
 Lachnagrostis plebeia - Western Australia, South Australia
 Lachnagrostis preissii - Western Australia
 Lachnagrostis rudis - South Australia, Victoria, New South Wales, Tasmania
 Lachnagrostis schlechteri - Cape Province of South Africa
 Lachnagrostis sodiroana - Ecuador, Peru
 Lachnagrostis striata - New Zealand (North + South)
 Lachnagrostis tenuis - New Zealand (South)
 Lachnagrostis uda - New Zealand (South)

 formerly included
see Agrostis Calamagrostis Gastridium Triplachne

References

Poaceae genera
Pooideae